Candidimonas bauzanensis is a Gram-negative, facultatively anaerobic, psychrophilic and motile bacterium from the genus Candidimonas which has been isolated from soil from Bozen in Italy.

References 

 

Burkholderiales
Bacteria described in 2012